Nazareth High School may refer to:

 Nazareth Area High School, Nazareth, Pennsylvania
 Nazareth Regional High School (Brooklyn), New York
 Nazareth Academy High School, Philadelphia, Pennsylvania
 Nazareth High School (Texas)